Parliamentary elections were held in Nigeria on 12 April 2003. The result was a victory for the ruling People's Democratic Party, which won 76 of the 109 Senate seats and 223 of the 360 House seats. Voter turnout was 50%.

Results

Senate

House of Representatives

Results by state 

 Bayelsa State
 Federal Capital Territory
 Kwara State
 Nasarawa State
 Taraba State

References

Parliamentary elections in Nigeria
Parliamentary election
Parl
Election and referendum articles with incomplete results
Nigeria parliamentary